New Moti Bagh is a residential colony in South Delhi. New Moti Bagh occupies an area of 143 acres, in the exclusive New Delhi Municipal Council (NDMC) area of New Delhi. It is one of Delhi's most expensive areas, where land rates vary from 10 lakhs to 12 lakhs a square yard. 

"Living in New Moti Bagh", according to senior Government official, is "next best thing to living in a Lutyens bungalow”.

History
Sanction for the project was given by the United Progressive Alliance (UPA) government led by Manmohan Singh in 2007. Work on the complex started in December of the same year. The project was assigned to the National Buildings Construction Corporation (NBCC), a Government of India undertaking. The work on the project was completed in 2012.

Residential Accommodation
There are a total of 492 residential units in the complex: 116 independent bungalows, and 376 large sized apartments. These residential units are provided to civil servants, police officers, and Judges, based on their pay grades, at a very nominal rent, free of tax, maintenance, security, civic, and other infrastructure liabilities, which are all paid by the government. The residential complex is popular and has a 99 percent occupancy. All units, and public areas, have power back-up. All units are also provided with solar water heating, assured hot and cold water, high grade floor finishing, and modular kitchens. In addition to the housing for senior civil servants there are 500 units for servants and other service providers, classified as Economical Weaker Section (EWS).

Type VIII Bungalows
There are 14 type VIII Bungalows in the complex. These are meant for Cabinet Ministers, Judges of Supreme Court & High Court of Delhi, Ministers of State (MoS) and Key Secretaries to Government of India. Each bungalow includes four servant quarters and two garages.

Type VII Bungalows
These bungalows, which are smaller than type VIII, are intended for the officers belong to pay level 17 & above  This type of bungalow have three servant quarters, two garages, front and rear lawns, and a driveway.

Type VI Multistorey Apartments
There are 376 type 6A apartments in ten blocks. These are meant for officers in the pay rank of level 15 & above. These apartments in addition to the dining and living room have 3 bedrooms, 1 guest room, and 2 servant quarters, and covered parking.

Amenities
New Moti Bagh residential complex is configured like a town ship. It has its own security, with CCTV, scanners, guards, captive power supply, solar heating system, solar lighting, waste management system, sewage recycling systems, water management systems, rainwater harvesting system,shopping area, bank, a restaurant, subsidized club, primary school, parks, jogging tracks, servant quarters etc. The clubs has a swimming pool, tennis courts, gym, pool, billiards, table tennis, and a beauty parlor.

Controversies
The New Moti Bagh residential club, in December 2013, become a source of acrimony between the Government and the civil servants. The New Moti Bagh Resident Welfare Association (NMBRWA), the Representative body of the civil servants, questioned the right of the Government to lease the club area to generate revenue, and threatened the government with legal action claiming that they have exclusive right over the use of the facility. Sudhir Krishna, the then Secretary, Ministry Of Urban Development, in response to circular by the NMBRWA warned that the residents are "tenants" of government housing, and "should not be demanding".

Water and Waste Management
New Moti Bagh Township consumes 800,000 liters of water every day, or approximately 1626 liters per household. It generate about 600,000 liters of sewage per day, which works out to about 1219 litres per household. The wastewater is treated in a 'wastewater treatment facility‘ which has capacity to 'purify' 5,60,000 litres of wastewater per day. The surplus treated water, according to an official National Buildings Construction Corporation (NBCC), "will be supplied to NDMC for irrigation and horticulture use". The township generates 4.5 tonnes household and 4 tonnes of horticulture waste per day. This is treated in a solid waste treatment plant, and an organic waste converter machine, which has a capacity of 1.5 tonnes per shift.

Security
There are three main entrances to the complex. The entrances are manned. The complex is covered by stringent security system with scanners and CCTV coverage etc.

References

External links
 New Motibagh wikimapia

Neighbourhoods in Delhi
New Delhi district
Cities and towns in New Delhi district